Santipur is a locality in Guwahati, Assam, India, near the south bank of the river Brahmaputra. It is near Bharalumukh.

Zip code is 781009.

There are temples, Namghar and a mosque located in the area. Santipur is well known for the Pragjyotish College.

Education
Sonaram High School, Pragjyotish College, Sun Flower English School, Santipur L.P. School are located here.

Famous personality

Arnab Goswami is an Indian journalist, the editor-in-chief and a news anchor of the Indian news channel Times Now and ET Now,  hails from this locality.

See also
 Pan Bazaar
 Paltan Bazaar
 Beltola

References

Neighbourhoods in Guwahati